Kitui South Constituency is an electoral constituency in Kenya. It is one of eight constituencies in Kitui County. The constituency was established for the 1963 elections. At the 1988 and 1992 elections it was known as Mutomo Constituency. The constituency has six wards, all electing Members of County Assembly for the Kitui County Government.

Members of Parliament

Wards

References 

Constituencies in Kitui County
Constituencies in Eastern Province (Kenya)
1963 establishments in Kenya
Constituencies established in 1963